The National Institute of Science Communication and Information Resources (NISCAIR), located at New Delhi, India, was an information science institute in India founded in 2002. In 2021, the institute was merged with National Institute of Science, Technology and Development Studies to form National Institute of Science Communication and Policy Research  (NIScPR). It operated under the umbrella of the Council of Scientific and Industrial Research (CSIR) that comprise 38 other labs and institutes in India. The institute published several academic journals and magazines.

History
In 2002, the Indian Scientific Documentation Centre (INSDOC), which came into being in 1952 under CSIR, was  merged with NISCOM in 2002, to form National Institute of Science Communication and Information Resources (NISCAIR).

General services

National Science Library services

Open access

18 journals and 3 popular science magazines (Science Reporter and its Hindi and Urdu editions) published by CSIR-NISCAIR are available as open access from the NISCAIR Online Periodicals Repository website.

List of publications
Academic journals

Magazines

Repository

Associateship in Information Science (AIS)
NISCAIR offered Associateship in Information Science (AIS), a two-year master's degree level professional programme, earlier.

References

External links
 

Research institutes in Delhi
Council of Scientific and Industrial Research
2002 establishments in Delhi
Research institutes established in 2002